The First Colijn cabinet was the cabinet of the Netherlands from 4 August 1925 until 8 March 1926. The cabinet was formed by the political parties Roman Catholic State Party (RKSP), Anti-Revolutionary Party (ARP) and the Christian Historical Union (CHU) after the election of 1925. The centre-right cabinet was a majority government in the House of Representatives. It was the first of five cabinets of Hendrikus Colijn, the Leader of the Anti-Revolutionary Party as Prime Minister.

Cabinet Members

 Retained this position from the previous cabinet.

References

External links
Official

  Kabinet-Colijn I Parlement & Politiek

Cabinets of the Netherlands
1925 establishments in the Netherlands
1926 disestablishments in the Netherlands
Cabinets established in 1925
Cabinets disestablished in 1926